The 50th Field Artillery Regiment (The Prince of Wales Rangers), Royal Canadian Artillery was a Canadian Army Reserve artillery regiment based in Peterborough, Ontario. The regiment exists "on paper" on the Supplementary Order of Battle.

The regiment was created in 1960 from the merger of 50th Medium Anti-Aircraft Artillery Regiment (The Prince of Wales Rangers), RCA - originally the 57th Peterborough Battalion of Infantry formed in 1867 and the 45th Medium Battery, RCA - originally as 45th Canadian Volunteer Militia and then as 45th West Durham Battalion of Infantry.

In 2015, the Canadian Forces authorized the award of an honorary distinction to The Prince of Wales Rangers (Peterborough Regiment), if and when it is ever activated from the SOB and converted to an armour or infantry unit: the wartime badge of the Stormont, Dundas and Glengarry Highlanders (SD&GH) with the year dates 1944–45 in recognition of the role played by the PWR in the mobilization of the Canadian Active Service Force unit of the SD&GH. This badge would be emblazoned on the unit's guidon or regimental colour.

Perpetuations 

 4th Brigade, CFA, CEF
 2nd Battalion (Eastern Ontario Regiment), CEF
 93rd Battalion (Peterborough), CEF
 109th Battalion (Victoria & Haliburton), CEF
 247th Battalion (Victoria & Haliburton), CEF
 252nd Battalion (Lindsay), CEF
 4th Battalion, CMGC, CEF
 4th Battery, CFA, CEF
 45th Depot Battery, CFA, CEF

Lineage

50th Field Artillery Regiment (The Prince of Wales Rangers), RCA 

 Originated on 3 May 1867 in Peterborough, Ontario, as the 57th Peterborough Battalion of Infantry.
 Redesignated on 16 January 1880 as the 57th Battalion of Infantry Peterborough Rangers.
 Redesignated on 8 May 1900 as the 57th Regiment Peterborough Rangers.
 Redesignated on 12 March 1920 as The Peterborough Rangers.
 Amalgamated on 15 December 1936 with the 3rd The Prince of Wales' Canadian Dragoons and the Headquarters and C Company of the 4th Machine Gun Battalion, CMGC, and redesignated as The Prince of Wales Rangers (Peterborough Regiment) (MG).
 Redesignated on 5 March 1942 as the 2nd (Reserve) Battalion, The Prince of Wales Rangers (Peterborough Regiment).
 Redesignated on 1 June 1945 as The Prince of Wales Rangers (Peterborough Regiment).
 Converted on 1 April 1946 from infantry to artillery, and redesignated as the 50th Heavy Anti-Aircraft Regiment (The Prince of Wales Rangers), RCA.
 Redesignated on 22 August 1955 as the 50th Medium Anti-Aircraft Regiment (The Prince of Wales Rangers), RCA.
 Redesignated on 12 April 1960 50th Medium Anti-Aircraft Artillery Regiment (The Prince of Wales Rangers), RCA.
 Amalgamated on 6 July 1960 with the 45th Medium Battery, RCA, and redesignated as the 50th Field Artillery Regiment (The Prince of Wales Rangers), RCA.
 Reduced to nil strength on 1 April 1970 and transferred to the Supplementary Order of Battle.

3rd Prince of Wales' Canadian Dragoons 

 Originated on 30 April 1875 in Cobourg, Ontario, as the 3rd Provisional Regiment of Cavalry.
 Redesignated on 14 October 1881 as the 3rd Provisional Regiment of Cavalry, The Prince of Wales' Canadian Dragoons.
 Redesignated on 25 November 1892 as the 3rd Regiment of Cavalry, The Prince of Wales' Canadian Dragoons.
 Redesignated on 1 January 1893 as the 3rd The Prince of Wales' Canadian Dragoons.
 Amalgamated on 15 December 1936 with The Peterborough Rangers and the Headquarters and C Company of the 4th Machine Gun Battalion, CMGC, and redesignated as The Prince of Wales Rangers (Peterborough Regiment) (MG).

4th Machine Gun Battalion, CMGC 

 Originated on 1 June 1919 in Kingston, Ontario, as the 4th Machine Gun Brigade, CMGC.
 Redesignated on 15 September 1924 as the 4th Machine Gun Battalion, CMGC.
 Amalgamated on 15 December 1936 with The Peterborough Rangers and the 3rd The Prince of Wales' Canadian Dragoons, and redesignated as The Prince of Wales Rangers (Peterborough Regiment) (MG).

45th Medium Battery, RCA 

 Originated on 2 February 1920 in Cornwall, Ontario, as the 45th Battery, CFA.
 Redesignated on 1 July 1925 as the 45th Field Battery, CA.
 Redesignated on 3 June 1935 as the 45th Field Battery, RCA.
 Amalgamated on 15 December 1936 with The Victoria and Haliburton Regiment, and redesignated as the 45th Field Battery (Howitzer), RCA.
 Redesignated on 7 November 1940 as the 45th (Reserve) Field Battery (Howitzer), RCA.
 Redesignated on 20 May 1942 as the 45th/56th (Reserve) Field Battery, RCA.
 Redesignated on 1 April 1946 as the 45th Field Battery, RCA.
 Redesignated on 19 June 1947 as the 45th Field Battery (Self-propelled), RCA.
 Amalgamated on 1 September 1954 with the 4th Field Regiment (Self- propelled), RCA and the 56th Field Battery (Self-propelled), RCA, and redesignated as the 45th Medium Battery, RCA.
 Amalgamated on 6 July 1960 with the 50th Medium Anti-Aircraft Artillery Regiment (The Prince of Wales Rangers), RCA and redesignated as the 50th Field Artillery Regiment (The Prince of Wales Rangers), RCA.

The Victoria and Haliburton Regiment 

 Originated on 16 November 1866 in Bowmanville, Ontario, as the 45th West Durham Battalion of Infantry.
 Redesignated on 1 January 1898 as the 45th Victoria Battalion of Infantry.
 Redesignated on 8 May 1900 as the 45th Victoria Regiment.
 Redesignated on 16 July 1917 as the 45th Victoria and Haliburton Regiment.
 Redesignated on 12 March 1920 as The Victoria and Haliburton Regiment.
 Amalgamated on 14 December 1936 with the 45th Field Battery, RCA and redesignated as the 45th Field Battery (Howitzer), RCA.

4th Field Regiment (Self-propelled), RCA 

 Originated on 9 May 1905 in Cobourg, Ontario, as the 10th Brigade of Field Artillery, CA.
 Redesignated on 2 February 1920 as the 4th Brigade, CFA.
 Redesignated on 1 July 1925 as the 4th Field Brigade, CA.
 Redesignated on 3 June 1935 as the 4th Field Brigade, RCA.
 Redesignated on 7 November 1940 as the 4th (Reserve) Field Brigade, RCA.
 Redesignated on 24 June 1942 as the 43rd (Reserve) Field Regiment, RCA.
 Redesignated on 1 April 1946 as the 4th Field Regiment, RCA.
 Redesignated on 19 June 1947 as the 4th Field Regiment (Self- propelled), RCA.
 Amalgamated on 1 September 1954 as the 45th Field Battery (Self-propelled), RCA and the 56th Field Battery (Self-propelled), RCA.

56th Field Battery (Self-propelled), RCA 

 Originated on 1 April 1912 in Goderich, Ontario, as the 31st Battery, CFA.
 Redesignated on 2 February 1920 as the 56th Battery, CFA.
 Redesignated on 1 July 1925 as the 56th Field Battery, CA.
 Redesignated on 3 June 1935 as the 56th Field Battery, RCA.
 Amalgamated on 15 December 1936 with The Grenville Regiment (Lisgar Rifles), and redesignated as the 56th (Grenville) Field Battery, (Howitzer), RCA.
 Redesignated on 1 December 1937 as the 56th (Grenville) Field Battery, RCA.
 Redesignated on 7 November 1940 as the 56th Reserve (Grenville) Field Battery, RCA.
 Redesignated on 1 April 1946 as the 56th Field Battery, RCA.
 Redesignated on 19 June 1947 as the 56th Field Battery (Self-propelled), RCA.
 Amalgamated on 1 September 1954, with the 4th Field Regiment (Self- propelled), RCA, the 45th Field Battery (Self- propelled), RCA, and the 4th Field Battery (Self-propelled), RCA, and redesignated the 45th Medium Battery, RCA.

The Grenville Regiment (Lisgar Rifles) 

 Originated on 12 April 1867 in Prescott, Ontario, as the 56th Prescott Battalion of Infantry.
 Redesignated on 9 August 1867 as the 56th Grenville Battalion of Infantry.
 Redesignated on 13 September 1871 as the 56th Grenville Battalion of Rifles.
 Redesignated on 29 September 1871 as the 56th Grenville Battalion “Lisgar Rifles”.
 Redesignated on 8 May 1900 as the 56th Grenville Regiment "Lisgar Rifles".
 Redesignated on 12 March 1920 as The Grenville Regiment (Lisgar Rifles).
 Amalgamated on 15 December 1936 with the 56th Field Battery, RCA, and redesignated as the 56th (Grenville) Field Battery, (Howitzer), RCA.

4th Field Battery (Self-propelled), RCA 

 Originated on 9 May 1905 in Peterborough, Ontario, as the 24th Field Battery, CA.
 Redesignated on 2 February 1920 as the 4th Battery, CFA.
 Redesignated on 1 July 1925, as the 4th Field Battery, CA.
 Redesignated on 3 June 1935 as the 4th Field Battery, RCA.
 Redesignated on 7 November 1940 as the 4th (Reserve) Field Battery, RCA.
 Redesignated on 1 September 1943 as the 4th (Reserve) Anti-Aircraft Battery (Type 2H), RCA.
 Redesignated on 1 April 1946 as the 4th Field Battery, RCA.
 Redesignated on 19 June 1947 as the 4th Field Battery (Self- propelled), RCA.
 Amalgamated on 1 September 1954 with the 4th Field Regiment (Self-propelled), RCA, the 45th Field Battery (Self-propelled), RCA, and the 56th Field Battery (Self-propelled), RCA, and redesignated the 45th Medium Battery, RCA.

Lineage Chart 

|-
|style="text-align: left;"|
class="wikitable"
+ Abbreviations used in the chart
-
! Abbreviation !! Phrase
-
 Arty  Artillery
-
 Bde  Brigade
-
 Bn  Battalion
-
 Bty  Battery
-
 CA  Canadian Artillery
-
 CASF  Canadian Active Service Force
-
 Cavy  Cavalry
-
 CEF  Canadian Expeditionary Force
-
 CFA  Canadian Field Artillery
-
 CMGC  Canadian Machine Gun Corps
-
 Coys  Companies
-
 Infy  Infantry
-
 MG  Machine Gun
-
 RCA  Royal Canadian Artillery
-
 Regt  Regiment

|-
|style="text-align: left;"|Notes:

Notable members
 Sir Sam Hughes - joined the 45th West Durham Battalion of Infantry

References

Field artillery regiments of Canada
Military units and formations established in 1960
Military units and formations disestablished in 1970
Organizations based in Peterborough, Ontario
Military units and formations of Ontario
Supplementary Order of Battle